Alexander Bílek (20 January 1941 – 20 April 2017) was a Czech racewalker. He competed for Czechoslovakia in the men's 20 kilometres walk at the 1964 Summer Olympics.

References

External links
 
 

1941 births
2017 deaths
Athletes (track and field) at the 1964 Summer Olympics
Czech male racewalkers
Olympic athletes of Czechoslovakia